Broadway Rhythm (1944) is a Metro-Goldwyn-Mayer Technicolor musical film. It was produced by Jack Cummings and directed by Roy Del Ruth.

The film was originally announced as Broadway Melody of 1944 to follow MGM's Broadway Melody films of 1929, 1936, 1938, and 1940. It was originally slated to star Eleanor Powell and Gene Kelly, but Louis B. Mayer and MGM loaned Kelly out to Columbia to play opposite Rita Hayworth in Cover Girl (1944). The film instead starred George Murphy, who had appeared in Broadway Melody of 1938 and Broadway Melody of 1940. Mayer then replaced Powell with Ginny Simms.

Other cast members included Charles Winninger, Gloria DeHaven, Lena Horne, Nancy Walker, Eddie "Rochester" Anderson, the Ross Sisters, and Ben Blue, as well as Tommy Dorsey and his orchestra.

Plot
Murphy plays a successful Broadway musical comedy producer named Johnnie Demming.  He needs a star for his new show. He's smitten with the glamorous film star, Helen Hoyt (Simms), and offers the part to her, but she turns him down because she wants to be sure she's in a hit.  Johnnie's father (Winninger), retired from vaudeville, wants to do his own show.  He gets his daughter, Patsy (DeHaven) and also Helen.  Johnnie feels betrayed by his father.

Cast

George Murphy as Jonnie Demming
Ginny Simms as Helen Hoyt
Charles Winninger as Sam Demming
Gloria DeHaven as Patsy Demming
Nancy Walker as Trixie Simpson
Ben Blue as Felix Gross
Lena Horne as Fernway de la Fer
Eddie "Rochester" Anderson as Eddie
Tommy Dorsey and his Orchestra
Hazel Scott as herself
Kenny Bowers as Ray Kent
The Ross Sisters as Maggie, Aggie and Elmira
Dean Murphy as Hired Man
Louis Mason as Farmer
Bunny Waters as Bunnie
Walter B. Long as Doug Kelly
Sara Haden as Miss Wynn

Soundtrack
The film is very loosely based on the Broadway musical Very Warm for May (1939). However, all the songs from the musical except for "All the Things You Are" were left out of the film. Some of the songs from the movie are by the writers of the original musical, Jerome Kern and Oscar Hammerstein II: 
 All the Things You Are 
 That Lucky Fellow
 In Other Words, Seventeen
 All in Fun

Additional songs
"Somebody Loves Me" by George Gershwin, Ira Gershwin
"Who's Who", "Solid Potato Salad", "Irresistible You", "Milkman Keep Those Bottles Quiet", "I Love Corny Music" by Raye and DePaul
"What Do You Think I Am", "Brazilian Boogie" by Martin and Blane
"Pretty Baby" by Tony Jackson, Egbert Van Alstyne, Gus Kahn
"Amor" by Gabriel Ruiz, Ricardo Lopez Mendez

See also
List of American films of 1944

References

External links

1944 films
1944 musical films
Metro-Goldwyn-Mayer films
Films directed by Roy Del Ruth
Films scored by Johnny Green
1940s English-language films
Films based on musicals
American musical films
1940s American films